Rudolf Mang (17 June 1950 – 12 March 2018) was a German heavyweight weightlifter. He competed at the 1968 and 1972 Olympics and placed fifth and second, respectively. Between 1971 and 1972 he won four more medals at the world and European championships and set two world records: one in the snatch and one in the press.

Death
Mang died of a heart attack at his gym in Bellenberg, Germany on 12 March 2018. He was 67.

References

External links

 

1950 births
2018 deaths
German male weightlifters
Olympic weightlifters of West Germany
Weightlifters at the 1968 Summer Olympics
Weightlifters at the 1972 Summer Olympics
Olympic silver medalists for West Germany
Olympic medalists in weightlifting
Medalists at the 1972 Summer Olympics
People from Neu-Ulm (district)
Sportspeople from Swabia (Bavaria)
European Weightlifting Championships medalists